Graeme Cunningham may refer to:

 Graeme Cunningham (cricketer) (born 1975), Australian cricketer
 Graeme Cunningham (footballer) (1922–?), Scottish amateur footballer